Eduard Burmistrov (born 24 February 1968) is a Russian luger. He competed at the 1992 Winter Olympics and the 1994 Winter Olympics.

References

External links
 

1968 births
Living people
Russian male lugers
Olympic lugers of the Unified Team
Olympic lugers of Russia
Lugers at the 1992 Winter Olympics
Lugers at the 1994 Winter Olympics
People from Bratsk
Sportspeople from Irkutsk Oblast